Chemotherapy: International Journal of Experimental and Clinical Chemotherapy is a peer-reviewed medical journal covering antimicrobial chemotherapy, published by Karger Publishers. The journal was established in 1960 and was originally named Chemotherapia, obtaining its current name in 1968. According to the Journal Citation Reports, the journal has a 2014 impact factor of 1.288.

References

External links
 

Oncology journals
Microbiology journals
Karger academic journals
Publications established in 1960
Bimonthly journals
English-language journals